Young Scots or Young Scot may refer to:

Young Scot,  the national information and citizenship organisation for young people aged 11-25 in Scotland
Young Scots' Society, a Scottish nationalist organisation at the break of the 20th century